Alyaksandr Grenkow (born 20 January 1978) is a retired Belarusian professional footballer.

Honours
Dinamo Minsk
Belarusian Cup winner: 2002–03

Shakhtyor Soligorsk
Belarusian Premier League champion: 2005
Belarusian Cup winner: 2003–04

External links
 
 
 

1978 births
Living people
Belarusian footballers
Belarusian expatriate footballers
Expatriate footballers in Ukraine
FC Torpedo-BelAZ Zhodino players
FC Dinamo Minsk players
FC Shakhtyor Soligorsk players
FC Kryvbas Kryvyi Rih players
FC Smolevichi players
Association football midfielders